A ship graveyard or ship cemetery is a location where the hulls of scrapped ships are left to decay and disintegrate, or left in reserve. Such a practice is now less common due to waste regulations and so some dry docks where ships are broken (to recycle their metal and remove dangerous materials like asbestos) are also known as ship graveyards.

By analogy, the phrase can also refer to an area with many shipwrecks which have not been removed by human agency, instead being left to disintegrate naturally. These can form in places where navigation is difficult or dangerous (such as the Seven Stones, off Cornwall, or Blackpool, on the Irish Sea); or where many ships have been deliberately scuttled together (as with the German High Seas Fleet at Scapa Flow); or where many ships have been sunk in battle (such as Ironbottom Sound, in the Pacific).

The majority of the ships in the world are constructed in the developed countries. Ships last about 25-30 years, after which they become too expensive to maintain and are sold to be broken down. Most of them are directly sold to the ship recycling companies in India, Bangladesh, Pakistan and other developing countries, also known as the (semi-)periphery countries from Immanuel Wallerstein’s World System Theory. In 2014, 54 percent of the ships went to the beaches of India and Bangladesh. 
This is consistent with the period 2012-2018. From the total of 6,702 scrapped ships worldwide, 3,586 ships have been scrapped in India and Bangladesh, which comes down to 53.5 percent. 

As of January 2020, with 30% share India has the highest global revenue and highest share of global ship breaking (number and volume of ships broken).

It is estimated that ship breaking yards provide more than 100,000 jobs to people worldwide and that they yield millions of tons of steel every year with a minimal consumption of electricity. Besides steel, this industry also yields a huge amount of solid wastes in the form of scrapped wood, plastic, insulation material, glass wool, sponge, waste paper, oiled rope and cotton waste.

List of ship graveyards

Africa

Wrecks all along the peninsular coast at Nouadhibou, in Mauritania
Many wrecks along the Skeleton Coast in Namibia

Asia

Several locations near the Aral Sea
The ship-breaking yards of Alang (India), Chittagong (Bangladesh), and Gadani (Pakistan)

Europe

France
Guilvinec-Lechiagat
On the River Rance
Magouër (Plouhinec, Morbihan)
Plouhinec, Finistère
Landévennec

United Kingdom
The River Tamar downstream of the Royal Albert Bridge used to be used as a mooring site for mothballed vessels, including submarines, of the Royal Navy. These have now all been removed.
Portsmouth Harbour hosts a number of ex Royal Navy vessels, awaiting removal for scrapping.
Forton Lake in Gosport, near Portsmouth, is host to approximately thirty vessels, several of which saw action in World War II.
Scapa Flow, where in 1919 German sailors sank their own fleet while internment. Most of the ships were excavated in the following years, but there are still 8 wrecks from this event and several others.

North America

United States

The US Navy "phantom fleet" at Suisun Bay, to the north of San Francisco Bay
The US Army Patuxent River ghost fleet" of 1927-40, comprising the USAT Monticello (ex-USS Agamemnon, ex-German SS Kaiser Wilhelm II of 1903), America (ex-German SS Amerika of 1905), Mount Vernon (ex-German Kronprinzessin Cecile of 1907) and George Washington (ex-German SS George Washington of 1909)
Witte's Marine Salvage - the Staten Island boat graveyard.
Bikini Atoll was designated as a ship graveyard for the U.S. Pacific fleet; it later became known as a nuclear testing facility.
Mallows Bay, Maryland.
Green Jacket Shoal, Rhode Island

Oceania

Australia

New South Wales:
 Stockton Breakwater (Newcastle)
 Homebush Bay Ships' Graveyard (Sydney)
 Pindimar Bay Ships' Graveyard/The Duckhole (Myall Lakes)
Northern Territory:
 Darwin Harbour East Arm
Queensland:
 Bishop Island Ships' Graveyard (Brisbane)
 Tangalooma Ships' Graveyard (Moreton Island)
 The Bulwer Wrecks (Moreton Island)
 Curtin Artificial Reef
South Australia:
 there are 19 ships' graveyards in South Australia.
Near Port Adelaide, in the Port River and environs:

Angas Inlet
Broad Creek 
Mutton Cove
Jervois Basin
Garden Island

Others

Ardrossan (the No 5 dumb hopper barge)
Cowell 
Glenelg 
Goat Island 
Kangaroo Island
Port Augusta 
Port Flinders
Port Lincoln 
Port Noarlunga
Port Pirie 
Port Stanvac 
Stenhouse Bay 
Whyalla
Yankalilla Bay (HMAS Hobart)

Tasmania:
 Little Betsey Island Ships' Graveyard (Hobart)
 East Risdon Ships' Graveyard (Hobart)
 Strahan Ships' Graveyard (Strahan)
 Tamar Island Ships' Graveyard (Launceston)
Victoria:
 Barwon Heads Ships' Graveyard (Port Phillip Bay)
Western Australia:
 Careening Bay Ships' Graveyard
 Rottnest Island Ships' Graveyard (off Rottnest Island)
 Jervoise Bay Ships' Graveyard
 Albany Ships' Graveyard (Albany)

See also
 Aircraft boneyard
 Ghost ship
 Derelict (maritime)
 Marine debris
 Marine pollution
 Shipbreaking
 Train graveyard

References

  Ship graveyards
  Ship graveyard on the Rance
  Ship graveyard at the port of Guilvinec-Lechiagat
  Ship graveyard at Magouër
 Google maps view of ships graveyard

 
Ship disposal
Shipwrecks
Waste
Vehicle graveyards